Dermatocarpon miniatum is a species of fungus belonging to the family Verrucariaceae.

It has cosmopolitan distribution. It is a known host to the lichenicolous fungus species Adelococcus immersus and Halecania alpivaga.

References

Verrucariales